The 1995 German Athletics Championships were held at the Weserstadion in Bremen on 30 June – 2 July 1995.

Results

Men

Women 

 : Wind assisted

References 
 Results source: 

1995
German Athletics Championships
German Athletics Championships